The Eureka Carnegie Library is a Carnegie library located at 520 N. Main in Eureka, Kansas. The library was built in 1914 through a $9,000 grant from the Carnegie Foundation. The George P. Washburn Co. designed the building in the Classical Revival style. The red brick library has a facade with three bays. The library's main entrance is within a projecting pavilion topped by a keystone and two voussoirs; the doorway once had a transom which has since been covered. A limestone entablature encircles the building, and the windows feature brick lintels with limestone keystones.

The library was added to the National Register of Historic Places on August 10, 1988.

References

External links

Libraries on the National Register of Historic Places in Kansas
Neoclassical architecture in Kansas
Library buildings completed in 1914
Buildings and structures in Greenwood County, Kansas
Carnegie libraries in Kansas
National Register of Historic Places in Greenwood County, Kansas
Eureka, Kansas